Baba Samid Mausoleum is a tomb belonging to the Safavid period.

History 
The tomb is located on the side of the highway in Shykhlyar village of Sabirabad District. The first 3 lines of the 9-line inscription of Baba Samid Mausoleum written in Arabic and Persian contain Surah XIX, verses 31-32 from the Quran. Lines 4-5 are dedicated to the praise of Hadrat Ali, and the other 4 lines contain the words "It was built for the head of the Sayyids (here sayyid means "great"), the source of happiness Baba Samid ibn Bektash ibn Sultan Ali ibn Hadrat Musa Arriza" in the month of Dhu al-Qadah in 993 AH (1585 AD) by the order of Shirvan beylerbeyi Abdollah Khan Ustajlu during the reign of Safavid Shah I Tahmasib. As it is seen from the inscription, Baba Samid is the son of Haji Bektash.

Baba Samid is a Shia Sufi sect widespread in medieval Azerbaijan and Turkey. It is thought to be a branch of the Bektashi Order. The history of the Baba Samid movement in Azerbaijan is poorly studied.

The Mausoleum is still visited by locals, but as a result of Soviet-era indifference, it has been impossible to study both Sufism and its traditions.

Graves 

Some of the children of Aghasi Khan (Ismail bey, Hashim Khan, Jafar bey, Abdulla bey, Mehdi bey), the khan of Shirvan, and his 3rd wife Khadijakhanum khanum were buried here.

References 

Safavid architecture
Religious buildings and structures completed in 1585